XHUM-FM is a radio station on 92.7 FM in Valladolid, Yucatán. It is owned by Cadena RASA and carries its Candela grupera format.

History
XEUM-AM 990, operating with 500 watts, received its concession on February 14, 1974. It was owned by Ricardo López Méndez. In the 1990s, XEUM increased power to 1,000 watts and was sold to Radiodifusora Comercial XEUM, S.A. de C.V., operating the station for Grupo ACIR. In 2005, ACIR was approved to move XEUM to 610 kHz with 10,000 watts. In 2006, Luis Aviña Ayala doing business as Medios Electrónicos de Valladolid bought the station.

XEUM moved to FM in 2010.

References

Radio stations in Yucatán
Radio stations established in 1974
Radio stations in Mexico with continuity obligations